Baykal (Bashkir and ) is a village in Nurimanovsky District of the Republic of Bashkortostan, Russia.

Rural localities in Nurimanovsky District